Calandrinia is a large genus of flowering plants known as purslanes and redmaids. It includes over 100 species of annual and perennial herbs which bear colorful flowers in shades of red to purple and white. Plants of this genus are native to Australia, western South America, Central America, and western North America. Some species have been introduced to parts of New Zealand, southern Africa, Asia, and Europe.

Description
Species in the genus Calandrinia are annual or perennial herbaceous plants with a sprawling or erect habit. The leaves are mostly basal and may be either alternate or opposite in arrangement. Flowers are produced in cymes. Each flower produces between four and eleven petals, though often five. Flowers may be white, purple, pink, red, or yellow.

Taxonomy
The genus Calandrinia was erected in 1823 by German botanist Carl Sigismund Kunth. It was named for Jean Louis Calandrini (1703–1758), a Genevan botanist.

The genus is classified in the family Montiaceae. It was previously placed in the purslane family, Portulacaceae.

Species
, accepted species in Kew's Plants of the World Online include:

Uses
Calandrinia balonensis is recorded in the 1889 book The Useful Native Plants of Australia as being called "periculia" by Indigenous Australians and that the plant was eaten by Europeans with bread while Indigenous Australians used it as a food when mixed with baked bark. "The seed is used for making a kind of bread, after the manner of that of Portulaca oleracea. (Mueller, Fragm., x., 71.)."

References

 
Caryophyllales genera